Soul Searching or Soul Searchin' may refer to:

 Soul Searching (Average White Band album), 1976
 Soul Searching (Shirley Scott album), 1959
 [[Soul Searchin' (Glenn Frey album)|Soul Searchin''' (Glenn Frey album)]], 1988
 "Soul Searchin'" (Glenn Frey song), the album's title track
 "Soul Searching", a Ronnie Earl album, 1988
 "Soul Searchin'" (Brian Wilson and Andy Paley song), 1990s
 [[Soul Searchin' (Jimmy Barnes album)|Soul Searchin' (Jimmy Barnes album)]], 2016
 Soul Searching (mixtape), 2019
 "Soul Searching", an episode of Power Rangers Wild Force "Soul Searching", a song by Little River Band from the album MonsoonSee also
 Soul Search'', album by Joe Morris